W. Kenneth Davis (July 26, 1918 – July 29, 2005) was an American chemist,  a leader of the World Energy Council, former vice president of the National Academy of Engineering, former U.S. Deputy Secretary of Energy, director of reactor development in the Atomic Energy Commission.

He was elected to the National Academy of Engineering in 1970 “for contributions to the development of nuclear power technology and its industrial application.” From May 14, 1981 to January 13, 1983, he served as United States Deputy Secretary of Energy under Ronald Reagan.

References 

1918 births
2005 deaths
20th-century American chemists
Members of the United States National Academy of Engineering
United States Deputy Secretaries of Energy